Jarmila Gajdošová and Arina Rodionova were the defending champions, but both players chose to participate at the 2015 Internazionali BNL d'Italia.

Makoto Ninomiya and Riko Sawayanagi won the title, defeating Eri Hozumi and Junri Namigata in the final, 7–6(12–10), 6–3.

Seeds

Draw

References 
 Draw

Kurume Best Amenity Cup - Doubles
Kurume Best Amenity Cup